Wardell Raymond Cheeks (born January 14, 1980) better known by his stage name Ray Cash, is an American rapper from Cleveland, Ohio.

Early life and education
Cheeks grew up in Cleveland. While in high school, he performed freestyle raps with his friends providing beats by banging on lunchroom tables. After Cheeks saw Jay-Z in concert during the Hard Knock Life tour, he decided to become a professional.

Career

First album
As Ray Cash, Cheeks released singles "Sex Appeal (Pimp in My own mind)" and "Smokin' and Leanin'" in 2005; those songs were played on local radio. In 2006, the hit single "Sex Appeal" was featured on music video platforms like; MTV Jams, BET 106 and Park, as well as a write up in the XXL magazine. For his debut album Cash on Delivery, he went on tour with Mobb Deep from May 3 to May 31.
Cash released Cash on Delivery under Sony Urban Music/Columbia on June 27, 2006. This album reached #41 on the Billboard 200. XXL praised the album. The second major single released from Ray Cash, featured the legendary hip hop artist, Scarface (rapper) entitled "Bumpin` my Music". In 2006, this single peaked on the Billboard charts reaching #56.

Second album
After the minor success of "C.O.D." Cash went right to work on his second album "Rosé Ray", which was released under M. Stacks Music on September 30, 2009. It features the street single "Certified" which features fellow Clevelander, Darren Anthony, and Curren$y (formerly of Young Money/Cash Money). The album was entirely produced by M. Stacks. The album also features "Darren Anthony" on a track titled "Let me". Recently, he last released a track called "Bitch I'm Wrong."

Discography

Albums

Singles

As a featured performer

Music videos

References

External links

 [ Biography at Billboard.com]

1980 births
African-American male rappers
American male rappers
Columbia Records artists
Living people
Rappers from Cleveland
21st-century American rappers
21st-century American male musicians
21st-century African-American musicians
20th-century African-American people